Garland Lee O'Shields (May 23, 1921 – January 17, 2001) was an American basketball player. He was an All-American college player at Tennessee and played briefly in the National Basketball League (NBL) and Basketball Association of America (BAA), predecessor leagues to the National Basketball Association.

O'Shields played for Spartanburg Community College and Tennessee. Following his college career, he played for the Chicago Stags of the BAA, scoring four points in 9 games.  The next season, he played for the Syracuse Nationals in the competing NBL, scoring 9 points in 5 games.

BAA career statistics

Regular season

References

External links

Minor League baseball statistics

1921 births
2001 deaths
All-American college men's basketball players
American men's basketball players
Baseball players from South Carolina
Basketball players from South Carolina
Chicago Stags players
Clinton Blues players
Guards (basketball)
Junior college men's basketball players in the United States
Knoxville Smokies players
Sportspeople from Spartanburg, South Carolina
Syracuse Nationals players
Tennessee Volunteers basketball players